Black Hope is the fifth album by Kenny Garrett, the first that he recorded for Warner Bros. It features Garrett in a quartet with pianist Kenny Kirkland, bassist Charnett Moffett and drummer Brian Blade. Additional musicians include veteran tenor saxophonist Joe Henderson and percussionist Don Alias.

Track listing 
 "Tacit Dance" –  6:08
 "Spanish-Go-Round" – 4:08 
 "Computer “G”" –  10:03
 "Van Gogh's Left Ear" –  7:39
 "Black Hope" –  3:51
 "Jackie & The Bean Stalk" – 7:02  
 "Run Run Shaw" –  4:45
 "2 Step" –  5:24
 "Bone Bop" – 4:53
 "Books & Toys" –  5:41
 "Bye Bye Blackbird" (Ray Henderson & Mort Dixon) –  4:32
 "Last Sax" – 1:34

All tracks composed by Kenny Garrett except for 11

Personnel 
Musicians
 Kenny Garrett – alto saxophone, soprano saxophone 
 Joe Henderson – tenor saxophone (tracks 1, 3, 11)
 Kenny Kirkland – piano (1, 2, 4-11), synthesizer (8, 9)
 Donald Brown – synthesizer (5, 8)
 Charnett Moffett – bass 
 Brian Blade – drums
 Ricky Wellman – drums
 Don Alias – percussion

Production
 Donald Brown – producer, engineer (mixing)
 Matt Pierson – executive producer
 Joe Ferla – engineer (recording, mixing)
 Kenny Garrett – engineer (mixing)
 Bob Ludwig – engineer (mastering)
 A.W. Dick – assistant engineer
 Chris Alberts – assistant engineer
 Mike Beard – computer host
 Peter Shukat – management
 Bibi Green – Production Coordination
 Linda Cobb – art Direction, design
 Keith Schoenheit – Photography (of flower)
 Chris Carroll – Photography (of Kenny)

References

1992 albums
Warner Records albums
Kenny Garrett albums
Albums produced by Matt Pierson